Fernando Vicente defeated Hicham Arazi 6–2, 3–6, 7–6(7–1) in the final to secure the title.

Seeds
The text in italics indicates the round in which that seed exited the tournament.

  Dominik Hrbatý (semifinals)
  Younes El Aynaoui (first round)
  Hicham Arazi (final)
  Mariano Puerta (first round)
  Karim Alami (first round)
  Christian Ruud (second round)
  Ramón Delgado (first round)
  Arnaud Di Pasquale (first round)

Draw

Finals

Section 1

Section 2

External links
 Official Results Archive (ATP)
 Official Results Archive (ITF)

Singles